Pirate and Traveler is a board game published by Milton Bradley in 1911. Revised editions were published in 1936, 1953, 1956, 1960, and 1970. Details of the game board, travel cards, spinner, pawns and box art varied between edition years. The game is no longer in production and is now considered a vintage collectible board game. 

The manufacturer's suggested number of players is 2 to 4, and is suggested for ages 7 and up. Playing time average is 60 minutes. Within a general descriptive category of board games, Pirate and Traveler is a "geography, pirate, adventure" game.

Game play involves drawing a travel card which dictates the journeys that are to be made by the travelers. The distance to be traveled in each move is determined by spinning a numbered wheel. Player moves his colored game piece, termed a "traveler", the corresponding number of spaces on the game board until he reaches his destination. The routes of travel were based on well-known railroad and steamship lines, and major cities and ports throughout the world.

See also
List of Milton Bradley Company products
Milton Bradley

References

External links

Board games introduced in 1911
Adventure board games
Milton Bradley Company games